Shivastotra (Sanskrit: शिवस्तोत्र), Shivastuti, or Shivastava is a Sanskrit hymn (Stotra) to Shiva.  It may refer to:

 Shiva Tandava Stotra
 Shiva Panchakshara Stotra
 Shiva Mahimna Stotra